The 1987 Ohio State Buckeyes football team represented the Ohio State University in the 1987 NCAA Division I-A football season. The Buckeyes compiled a 6–4–1 record.

Schedule

Personnel

1988 NFL draftees

Game summaries

West Virginia

Oregon

LSU

Illinois

Indiana

at Purdue

Minnesota

Michigan State

Wisconsin

Iowa

Michigan

Earle Bruce's final game as Ohio State head coach.

References

Ohio State
Ohio State Buckeyes football seasons
Ohio State Buckeyes football